Zabkattus is a genus of Papuan jumping spiders that was first described by J. X. Zhang & Wayne Paul Maddison in 2012.

Species
 it contains four species, found in Papua New Guinea:
Zabkattus brevis Zhang & Maddison, 2012 (type) – New Guinea
Zabkattus furcatus Zhang & Maddison, 2012 – New Guinea
Zabkattus richardsi Zhang & Maddison, 2012 – New Guinea
Zabkattus trapeziformis Zhang & Maddison, 2012 – New Guinea

References

Salticidae genera
Salticidae
Spiders of Asia